Biswajit Biswas (born 19 March 1995 in Kolkata) is an Indian footballer who plays as a forward for United S.C. in the I-League.

Career

Churchill Brothers
Biswas made his debut for Churchill Brothers S.C. during the 2013 AFC Cup on 12 March 2013 against Semen Padang in which he came on as an 85th-minute substitute for Bineesh Balan as Churchill Brothers drew the match 2–2.

United
On 1 September 2013 Biswajit signed for United S.C. He made his debut on 22 September 2013 against Rangdajied United at the Salt Lake Stadium in which he played till only 6 minutes and was replaced by C.K. Vineeth as United won the match 2-0.

Career statistics

Club

References

External links 
 

1995 births
Living people
Association football forwards
Indian footballers
I-League players
Footballers from Kolkata
Churchill Brothers FC Goa players
United SC players